I.T.A.L.Y.: I Trust and Love You is a 2008 Philippine romantic comedy film directed by Mark A. Reyes. It stars Jolina Magdangal, Dennis Trillo and Rufa Mae Quinto. The film was filmed in three different continents: Asia, Europe and Africa. The movie was produced by GMA Pictures.

The film was slated to be released in Europe on the same day of its Philippine premiere of August 6, 2008, but was moved to September 17, 2008. The movie earned  on its opening week.

Plot
Destiny. Is it beyond our control? Or do we make our own? These questions and other musings about the past and the future set the tone as we sail into the year's most anticipated film about love and life.

Six people are brought together on a seven-day cruise that will change their lives forever:

 A hopeless romantic (Jolina Magdangal) searches for the right man for her, while dreaming of becoming a singer.
 A successful businessman (Dennis Trillo) searches for the truth about a woman from his past.
 A senior housekeeper (Eugene Domingo) finds out that it is never too late to find true love.
 A young waiter (Mark Herras) finds the woman of his dreams, but she is beyond his reach.
 A young brat (Rhian Ramos) finds out that love does not have to be as complicated as her love-hate relationship with her mother.
 And a sexy lounge singer (Rufa Mae Quinto) searches for the perfect man who will keep his promises and who will never leave her.

This comedy-romance-drama-musical will make you swoon, cry, laugh, and fall in love all over again. While it takes you to three continents around the world (Asia, Africa, and Europe), it is nevertheless an intimate film about searching for love, following your dreams, and making your own destiny.

Cast and characters
Main cast
 Jolina Magdangal as Destiny Pinlac
 Rufa Mae Quinto as Stella Sembrano
 Dennis Trillo as Paolo Guzman
 Eugene Domingo as Lovely Mercado
 Rhian Ramos as Phoebe Villaroso
 Mark Herras as Nathan Reyes

Supporting cast
Ida Henares as Elena Villaroso
Pen Medina as Gary Pinlac
Aljur Abrenica as Budoy Pinlac
Edgar Allan Guzman as Gadoy Pinlac
Joaquin Valdes as Larry Shortfall
Edgar Llarosa as Hander
Tracie Mandalog as Hannah
Andrea Delogu as Sofia
Chariz Solomon as Crissy

Guest cast
Marvin Agustin as Patrick

Media Release
The series was released onto DVD-format and VCD-format by Viva Video. The DVD contained the movie plus bonus features like the music video of "Will of the Wind" plus the full-length trailer of the movie. The DVD/VCD was released in 2008. The final gross of the movie is  according to Box Office Mojo.

References

External links
 

GMA Pictures films
2008 films
2000s Tagalog-language films
2000s Italian-language films
2008 romantic comedy-drama films
Philippine romantic comedy-drama films
2000s English-language films
Films directed by Mark A. Reyes
2008 multilingual films
Philippine multilingual films